Banner Township is one of twenty-six townships in Fulton County, Illinois, USA.  As of the 2010 census, its population was 373 and it contained 177 housing units.  The township was known as Utica Township, then Monterey Township, before becoming Banner Township.

Geography

Cities, towns, villages
 Banner

Unincorporated towns
 Monterey
(This list is based on USGS data and may include former settlements.)
 Kings Hill (Settlement with school & burying ground)
 Mills point
 Copperas Creek landing
 Commerce Was an early village on the mouth of the copperas creek where it empties into the Illinois River. Just like Mills Point it never materialized & ceased to exist. It was platted in 1843 by Lyman B. Suydam.

Cemeteries
The township contains these four cemeteries: Bybee, Kings Hill, Utica and Walnut.

Major highways
  US Route 24
  Illinois Route 9

Lakes
 Pond Lily Lake
 Slim Lake

Demographics

School districts
 Canton Union School District 66
 Illini Bluffs Community Unit School District 327

Political districts
 Illinois' 17th congressional district
 State House District 91
 State Senate District 46

References
 
 United States Census Bureau 2007 TIGER/Line Shapefiles
 United States National Atlas

External links
 City-Data.com
 Illinois State Archives

Townships in Fulton County, Illinois
Townships in Illinois